Rabia Gülec (also spelled Guelec; born 5 June 1994 in Nuremberg) is a German taekwondo athlete. She represented Germany at the 2016 Summer Olympics in Rio de Janeiro, in the women's 67 kg. She finished in 9th place after losing to eventual bronze medalist Nur Tatar of Turkey in the quarterfinals.

References

External links
 
 
 
 
 
 
 

1994 births
Living people
German female taekwondo practitioners
Olympic taekwondo practitioners of Germany
Taekwondo practitioners at the 2016 Summer Olympics
Taekwondo practitioners at the 2015 European Games
European Games competitors for Germany
World Taekwondo Championships medalists
European Taekwondo Championships medalists
Sportspeople from Nuremberg
21st-century German women